Lubahn may refer to:

Lubāna, a Latvian town

People with the surname
Andrew Lubahn (born 1991), American soccer player
Douglas Lubahn (1947–2019), American musician